William Robert Allen (January 1, 1849 – October 11, 1928) was an early 20th-century architect in Utah. His most important work, the Davis County Courthouse, is no longer extant, yet a number of his works are listed on the U.S. National Register of Historic Places. Allen received training through the International Correspondence Schools which was based in Scranton, Pennsylvania, but allowed him to receive training and continue work in Utah.

He nearly monopolized architecture in Davis County, and was irritated to find others' works. He criticized another's work as a "It has a Queen Anne front and a jackass behind".

Works 

 John George Moroni Barnes House (1869), Kaysville, Utah, NRHP-listed
 John R. Barnes House (1869), Kaysville, NRHP-listed
 Kaysville Presbyterian Church (1887), Kaysville
 Kaysville Academy (1888)
 Kaysville City Hall (1889), Kaysville
 Farmer's Union Building (1890), Layton, Utah, NRHP-listed
 Governor Henry Blood House (c.1896), Kaysville, NRHP-listed
 George W. Layton House (1897), Layton, NRHP-listed
 John Henry Layton House (1898), Layton, NRHP-listed
 Davis County Courthouse (1899), Farmington, Utah
 Thomas J. and Amanda N. Smith House (1901), Kaysville, NRHP-listed
 First National Bank of Layton (1905), Layton, NRHP-listed
 Kaysville Tabernacle (1912), Kaysville
 Kaysville Elementary School (1918), Kaysville

 Barnes Block, Kaysville
 Hyrum Stuart Residence, Kaysville
 William Allen Residence, Kaysville
 Farmington C&M Company, Farmington

Gallery

See also 
 Photos of the Davis County Courthouse designed by William Allen
 National Register of Historic Places listings in Davis County, Utah

References 

Architects from Utah
1849 births
1928 deaths
People from Kaysville, Utah